Miss Grand Puerto Rico is a national title bestowed upon a woman chosen to represent Puerto Rico at Miss Grand International, an annual international beauty pageant promoting peace and opposing all forms of conflict. The national pageant of Miss Grand International for Puerto Rico is currently conducted by Nuestra Belleza Puerto Rico, Inc., to which MGI PLC, the owner of Miss Grand International, awarded the franchise in 2016. One of the winners of the "Nuestra Belleza Puerto Rico" pageant gets the title of Miss Grand Puerto Rico.

The highest placement of Puerto Rico's representative at Miss Grand International is the winner, won in 2013 by former Miss World Puerto Rico 2011, Janelee Chaparro.

History

2013–2015: Early years
Puerto Rico debuted in Miss Grand International in 2013, and the franchise was under the Miss World Puerto Rico contest until 2016, when a San Juan-based event organizer led by Miguel R. Deliz, Nuestra Belleza Puerto Rico, Inc., took over the license.

Under the direction of Miss Mundo Puerto Rico, the first representative, Janelee Chaparro, was appointed to join the international contest in Thailand and also won the title. The following two candidates were determined through the Miss World Puerto Rico pageant.

2016–present: Nuestra Belleza Puerto Rico
In the early days after acquiring the franchise, most of the country's representatives at Miss Grand International were appointed. However, the pageant was canceled in 2020 and 2021 due to the COVID-19 pandemic, and the representatives for the aforementioned international contests were instead determined through the casting process.

Since 2022, Nuestra Belleza Puerto Rico, Inc. only holds the Puerto Rican license for Miss Grand International, Miss International, and Miss Supranational.

Titleholders
The following is a list of Puerto Rico representatives at the Miss Grand International contest.

Gallery

References

External links

 
 Nuestra Belleza Puerto Rico Official Website

Puerto Rico